Operation Avalanche is the name given to the Allied invasion of Italy in 1943.

Operation Avalanche may also refer to:

Operation Avalanche, the Austro-Hungarian diversionary attack on Italy in the First World War at the Battle of the Piave River
Operation Avalanche (child pornography investigation), A U.S. investigation of child pornography on the Internet, launched 1999
Operation Avalanche (Afghanistan), a U.S.-led coalition offensive in Afghanistan, 2003
Operation Avalanche (film), a 2016 film about faking the Apollo 11 moon landing

See also
 Avalanche (disambiguation)